This is the list of retail markets located in Estonia. The list is incomplete.

See also
List of shopping malls in Estonia

References 

 
Markets
Retailing-related lists